is a 1955 Japanese film directed by Bin Kato.

Cast
 Ichikawa Raizō VIII
 Hisako Yamane

References

External links
 

Japanese black-and-white films
1955 films
Films directed by Bin Kato
Daiei Film films
1950s Japanese films